Phendioxan is an α1-adrenergic receptor antagonist.

See also
 WB-4101

References

Alpha-1 blockers
Amines
Dioxanes
Heterocyclic compounds with 2 rings
Methoxy compounds
Oxygen heterocycles